Barnabe Jolicoeur (born 1 September 1966) is a former Mauritian sprinter who competed in the men's 100m competition at the 1996 Summer Olympics. He recorded a 10.57, not enough to qualify for the next round past the heats. His personal best is 10.52, set in 1996. He also ran for the Mauritian 4 × 100 m relay team, which finished 7th in its heat at 40.92.

References

External links
 

1966 births
Living people
Mauritian male sprinters
Athletes (track and field) at the 1996 Summer Olympics
Olympic athletes of Mauritius